"Dance with Me" is a song by English/Australian soft rock duo Air Supply from their seventeenth album, Mumbo Jumbo. It was released as the first single from the album. The song was a top 30 hit on the U.S. Billboard Adult Contemporary chart in May 2010, peaking at No. 28 and staying on the chart for 3 weeks.

Personnel
Russell Hitchcock – lead vocals
Graham Russell – vocals, guitar
Frankie Moreno – piano
Russell Letizia – guitar
Jonni Lightfoot – bass
Mike Zerbe – drums

References

2009 songs
2010 singles
Air Supply songs
Songs written by Graham Russell